Cinderella Man is a 2009 Korean drama directed by Yeo Jeong-Joon and starring Kwon Sang-woo and Im Yoon-ah as the main protagonists. The drama is about lookalikes Oh Dae-san and Lee Jun-hee (both played by Kwon Sang-woo) who live very different lives. It was first aired on April 15, 2009, and was last aired on June 4, 2009.

Synopsis
Modeled after a more modern, masculine version of Cinderella. Dae-san is a clothing designer who operates a small shop in Dongdaemun Market and dreams of wealth. He meets Joon-hee one day, the heir of a fashion empire, who invites him to become him. Eventually, Dae-sun outsmarts the boss, Lee Jae-min, and eventually finds true love.

Cast

Main characters
 Lee Joon-hee played by Kwon Sang-woo
Second son of the founder of a fashion empire and heir apparent. He is tall and has an athletic build. He's handsome and has a sharp eye for style. But he is arrogant and hates complications in his life. He was sent off to France where he spent 19 years of his life. Upon hearing about his father's illness, he returns to Korea and his grandmother, the chairwoman of the company, makes him take a managerial position at the company. Having a heart problem just like his later mother, he asks Oh Dae-san, who is his lookalike, to pose as him for a month so that he can secretly get a heart operation without anyone in his family knowing about his medical condition. And with that he goes off to Paris for his operation...

 Seo Yoo-jin played by Im Yoon-ah
An aspiring designer. She has a sharp sense of style and a lot of pride. One of the star graduates of a famous Paris fashion design school, she starts from the bottom in the fashion industry by working for Dae-san when her father, a clothes wholesaler, suddenly passes away. She doesn't get along with Dae-san and constantly quarrels with him. By chance she meets the rich Lee Jae-min again whom she met before in Paris. His family owns a fashion empire and she can't make up her mind whether to choose Jae-min or Dae-san, whom she has gradually grown fond of.

 Jang Sae-eun's played by Han Eun-jung
The only daughter of the founder of a mutual fund empire. She studied fashion design overseas. Having sultry good looks, she did model gigs during her high school years. She is very conscious about the latest fashion trends. During her time abroad, she regrets turning down Jae-min when he proposed marriage to her, and so she wants to give him a second chance to rekindle their relationship. But she gets upset when Jae-min doesn't show much of an interest in her. Then she spots Oh Dae-san and is attracted to his street smarts.

 Oh Dae-san played by Kwon Sang-woo
Sells clothes in the back alleys of Dongdaemun Market and obsesses about getting rich. Tall and handsome, he is a hustler and dresses well as he marches ahead on the road towards becoming a successful merchant. Growing up as an orphan, he does not fear failure nor does he trust anyone. He meets Lee Joon-hee, heir to a fashion empire, and when Lee sees that Dae-san looks just like him, he asks him if he would switch places with him...

 Lee Jae-min played by Song Chang-eui
Eldest son in the family that owns a fashion empire. As Joon-hee's stepbrother, he makes decisions after weighing all the options before him and has impeccable manners. He is at odds with his step-grandmother, who wishes to hand over the reins of the company to her grandson Joon-hee, who also happens to be a talented businessman. The only woman who gives him comfort is Seo Yoo-jin, whom he met in Paris but he figures that he must marry Jang Sae-eun whose family is very wealthy and influential...

Supporting characters
 Jung Hye-sun as Company owner Kang Ju-ok
 Yoo Hye-ri as Lady Oh Seon-yeong
 Ahn Suk-hwan as Steward Ahn
 Jeong Gyoo-soo as Director Shin Ki-cheol
 Lee Byung-joon as Elegance Choi
 Jung Woo as Ma Yi-san
 Kim Min-hee as Team leader Lee
 Kang Dong-yeob as Kim Dong-hyeon
 Ryoo Sang-wook as Park Seung-jae
 Lee Yeon-doo as Kang Yoon-jeong
 Lee Kyung-jin as Yoo-jin's mother
 Jang Jung-hee as Lee Kkeut-soon
 Kwon Tae-won as Company president Park
 Hwang Eun-jeong as 3 hundred million
 Ra Mi-ran as Velvet Lee
 Lim Hyeok-pil as B-Boy Dancer meeting MC
 Son Ho-jun as Yeo Jeong Min 
 Kil Yong-woo as Yoo-jin's father - Cameo
 Sa Mi-ja - Cameo
 Ahn Nae-sang - Cameo
 Lee Dae-yeon - Cameo
 Lee Il-hwa - Cameo
 Jeon Soo-kyeong - Cameo
 Lee Hye-eun - Cameo
 Choi Soo-rin - Cameo
 Jung Jin as orphanage director - Cameo (ep 15)
 Jeong Byeong-cheol - as shopping street promotion president
 Shin Na-ri
 Kim Min-jwa as Ae-ran
 Lee Sang-bong

Ratings
In the tables below, the blue numbers represent the lowest ratings and the red numbers represent the highest ratings.

Source: TNS Media Korea

References

External links
 Cinderella Man official MBC website 
 
 

MBC TV television dramas
Korean-language television shows
2009 South Korean television series debuts
2009 South Korean television series endings
South Korean romance television series